Eusebius (Greek Εὐσέβιος "pious" from eu (εὖ) "well" and sebein (σέβειν) "to respect") may refer to:

 Eusebius of Laodicea (died 268), bishop of Laodicea
 Pope Eusebius (died 310), Pope in 309 or 310
 Eusebius (AD 263 – 339; Eusebius of Caesarea and Eusebius Pamphili): Christian exegete, historian and polemicist. 
 Eusebius of Nicomedia (died 341), bishop of Berytus, Nicomedia and Constantinople, leader of Arianism
 Eusebius (consul 347) (died c. 350), Roman consul in 347
 Saint Eusebius of Rome (died 357), priest and martyr
 Eusebius (consul 359), Roman consul in 359
 Eusebius of Emesa (300–360), bishop of Emesa
 Eusebius (praepositus sacri cubiculi), under Constantius II (died 361 AD)
 Eusebius of Gaza (died c. 362), early Christian martyr
 Saint Eusebius of Vercelli (283–371), bishop of Vercelli, opponent of Arianism
 Saint Eusebius of Samosata (died 4th-century), bishop of Samosata
 Saint Eusebius the Hermit (4th century), solitary monk of Syria
 Eusebius of Myndus (4th century), Neoplatonist philosopher
 Eusebius (sophist) (4th century), Roman sophist
 Saint Eusebius of Cremona (died c. 423), monk, pre-congregational saint, and disciple of Jerome
 Saint Eusebius (bishop of Milan) (died 462), archbishop of Milan
 Eusebius (consul 489), Roman consul in 489 and 493
 Eusebius of Dorylaeum (5th century), bishop of Dorylaeum, opponent of Nestorianism and Monophysitism

 Eusebius, bishop of Paris until his death in 555
 Eusebius of Alexandria (6th century), Christian author
 Eusebius of Thessalonika (6th or 7th century), bishop of Thessalonika during the time of Pope Gregory the Great
 Hwaetberht (died c. 740s), Abbot of Monkwearmouth-Jarrow Priory, who wrote under the pen-name of Eusebius

 Eusebius of Angers (died 1081), bishop of Angers
 Eusebius of Esztergom, c. 1200-1270) Hungarian priest, hermit, founder of the Order of Saint Paul the First Hermit
 Karl Eusebius of Liechtenstein (1611–1684), the second prince of Liechtenstein
 Eusebius, pen name of Edmund Rack (1735–1787)
 Eusebius, one of the personae of Robert Schumann (1810–1856)
 Eusebius Barnard (1802–1865), American minister and abolitionist

 Evsei Liberman (1897–1981) Soviet economist

Eusebius is also the name of:
 Jerome (347–420), Christian scholar and church father, whose full name was Eusebius Sophronius Hieronymus

See also
 Eusebia (disambiguation)
 Eusebio (disambiguation)
 Eusebeia (Greek: εὐσέβεια), a Greek philosophical and Biblical concept meaning inner piety, spiritual maturity, or godliness.